Lady Dufferin may refer to:

Helen Blackwood, Baroness Dufferin and Claneboye (1807–1867), songwriter, poet, and society lady.
Hariot Hamilton-Temple-Blackwood, Marchioness of Dufferin and Ava (1843–1935), who supported her husband's diplomatic work in Canada and India, where she founded many hospitals for women
Maureen Constance Guinness (1907–1998), society figure who married Basil Hamilton-Temple-Blackwood, 4th Marquess of Dufferin and Ava in 1930
Lindy Hamilton-Temple-Blackwood, Marchioness of Dufferin and Ava, artist, chatelaine of Clandeboye, and widow of Sheridan Hamilton-Temple-Blackwood, 5th Marquess of Dufferin and Ava

See also
Baron Dufferin and Claneboye